Brahim Ait Sibrahim (born 1 January 1967) is a Moroccan alpine skier. He competed at the 1984 Winter Olympics and the 1992 Winter Olympics.

References

1967 births
Living people
Moroccan male alpine skiers
Olympic alpine skiers of Morocco
Alpine skiers at the 1984 Winter Olympics
Alpine skiers at the 1992 Winter Olympics
Place of birth missing (living people)